Pablo Tac (1822–1841) was a Luiseño (Quechnajuichom also spelled "Qéchngawichum") Indian and indigenous scholar who provided a rare contemporary Native American perspective on the institutions and early history of Alta California. He created the first writing system for Luiseño, and his work is the "only primary source of Luiseño language written by a Luiseño until the twentieth century."

Life

Tac was born of Luiseño parents at Mission San Luis Rey de Francia and attended the Mission school. A promising student, he (along with another boy) was singled out by the Franciscan missionary, Father Antonio Peyrí, to accompany Peyrí when he left California in 1832. "On January 15, 1834, Father Peyrí, Pablo, and Agapito left San Fernando College [Mexico City] and in February boarded a ship for Europe. They travelled via New York and France, arriving in Barcelona, Spain, on June 21. The 'New' World was coming to meet the 'Old' World." Tac arrived in Rome in September 1834 and was enrolled in the College of the Propaganda, studying Latin grammar. He went on to study rhetoric, humanities, and philosophy in preparation for missionary work, but he died in 1841.

Works

As a student, Tac wrote a Luiseño grammar and dictionary for the linguist Giuseppi Mezzofanti, and notably included a history as part of his manuscript. He created a way of writing Luiseño that drew on Latin and Spanish. It is unlike the modern way of writing Luiseño.

Tac also wrote an essay on the "Conversion of the San Luiseños of Alta California." The latter includes information on aboriginal lifeways (including dances and games) and the history and organization of the Mission, along with two drawings by Tac. Tac authored an early account of life at Mission San Luis Rey entitled Indian Life and Customs at Mission San Luis Rey: A Record of California Mission Life by Pablo Tac, An Indian Neophyte (written circa 1835, edited and translated by Minna Hewes and Gordon Hewes in 1958). In the book, Tac lamented the rapid decline of his people:

In Quechla not long ago there were 5,000 souls, with all their neighboring lands. Through a sickness that came to California 2,000 souls died, and 3,000 were left." 

Tac went on to describe the preferential treatment the padres received:

In the mission of San Luis Rey de Francia the Fernandino [sic] father is like a king. He has his pages, alcaldes, majordomos, musicians, soldiers, gardens, ranchos, livestock...." 

Tac also noted that his people initially attempted to bar the Spaniards from their southern California homelands. When the foreign invaders approached, 
"...the chief stood up...and met them," demanding, "...what are you looking for? Leave our country!"

Commemorations

For the 2005 Venice Biennale, Luiseño artist James Luna created an artwork dedicated to the memory of Pablo Tac. The piece, titled Emendatio, included three installations, Spinning Woman, Apparitions: Past and Present, and The Chapel for Pablo Tac, as well as a personal performance in Venice, Renewal. It was sponsored by the National Museum of the American Indian.

On June 7, 2012, a hall at Mission San Luis Rey was named in honor of Pablo Tac.

In July 2019, author Christian Clifford presented the workshop "Pablo Tac: Indian from the far shores of California" in Ohio at the 80th annual Tekakwitha Conference, a Catholic Native American organization.

On June 8, 2021, the Oceanside Unified School District Board of Education announced that it will consider renaming San Luis Rey and Garrison Elementary Schools (combined during the 2019/2020 school year) one of the SLR Renaming Citizens Advisory Committee top three name recommendations of Dolores Huerta, Pablo Tac, or John Lewis Elementary School. After brief presentations on the three proposed names, the OUSDBOE voted 5-0 to rename the combined schools after Pablo Tac.

See also

Population of Native California
List of Native American artists
Visual arts by indigenous peoples of the Americas

Notes

References

 McFadden, David Revere and Ellen Napiura Taubman. Changing Hands: Art without Reservation 2: Contemporary Native North American Art from the West, Northwest and Pacific. New York: Museum of Arts and Design, 2005. .
 Nottage, James H., ed. Diversity and Dialogue. Seattle: University of Washington Press, 2008. .
 Oceanside Unified School District Board of Education. "Agenda Item Details: Consideration to Rename San Luis Rey Elementary School", June 8, 2021. 
 Redacción ACI Prensa. Estos nativos de América del Norte podrían ser declarados mártires y santos, aciprensa, Aug. 13, 2019. 
 Sisson, Paul.“Luiseno Gets Place of Honor”. San Diego Union Tribune, June 9, 2012.
 Smith, Peter Jesserer. "Unveiling Potential Saints for the Americas". National Catholic Register, Aug. 12, 2019.

1822 births
1841 deaths
Luiseño people
Native American academics
Native American history of California
Native American illustrators
People from Oceanside, California
Spanish colonization of the Americas
Date of birth unknown
19th-century Native Americans